Choristhemis olivei, more commonly known as delicate tigertail, is a species of Odonata spanning from the family Synthemistidae and the genus Choristhemis.
This species originates from north-eastern Queensland, Australia, and some scientists speculate that this species are endemic to Mount Lewis. Specimens of the Choristhemis olivei were first discovered in 1908 by R. J. Tillyard when two males of this species were found in Australia and documented in 1909. In 1999, one additional male was collected and documented by Günther Theischinger. The species is also noted in the Zoological Society of London. More recently, two scientists discovered a multitude of Choristhemis olivei on Thornton Peak, located on Cape Tribulation. One of these scientists took a sample of the larvae found on Thornton Peak for further research.

Larvae
The sample of larvae taken from the peak yielded an accurate description of the Choristhemis olivei. The specimen measured a length of 17.5 millimetres, the width of the head measuring 4.1 mm, and the abdomen length 12.1 mm. The specimen was a mix of gray and brown with a short frontal plate and long, wide setal structures. These characteristics are believed to be unique to this species, mainly because of a small body overall compared to most species of the Synthemistidae family. Choristhemis olivei generally prefer a wet tropic habitat, often residing along lotic freshwater and streams in their adult years.

Conflict
Some scientists speculated that Choristhemis olivei and Choristhemis flavoterminata specimens found in Australia were that of the same species. More recently however, multiple scientists came to the conclusion that these two species are not the same because of the difference in the male's anal appendages.

See also
 List of Odonata species of Australia

References

Synthemistidae
Odonata of Australia
Insects of Australia
Endemic fauna of Australia
Taxa named by Robert John Tillyard
Insects described in 1909